"All This Love" is a song by German DJ and record producer Robin Schulz and American singer Harlœ. The song was released on 3 May 2019. The song was written by Stuart Crichton, Dennis Bierbrodt, Jürgen Dohr, Guido Kramer, Tommy Lee James, Stefan Dabruck, Robin Schulz, Jessica Karpov and Daniel Deimann.

Music video
The official music video of the song was released on 9 May 2019 through Robin Schulz's YouTube account. The music video was directed by Robert Wunsch.

Track listing

Charts

Weekly charts

Year-end charts

Certifications

References

2019 singles
2019 songs
Robin Schulz songs
Songs written by Stuart Crichton
Songs written by Robin Schulz
Songs written by Tommy Lee James
Songs written by Jürgen Dohr